NPG may refer to:

Music
The New Power Generation, the former backing group of the musician Prince
NPG Records, a record label of the musician Prince
NPG Music Club, a website of the musician Prince

Organisations
Nageswar Patra Group, an Indian diversified company
Nature Publishing Group, a publisher based in London
Negative Population Growth, an organization in the United States
Nederlands Padvindsters Gilde (Dutch Girl-pathfinders Guild), an organisation that became Scouting Nederland
News-Press & Gazette Company, a United States media group
National Portrait Gallery (disambiguation), several galleries
Northern Powergrid, electrical Distribution Network Operator in the United Kingdom

Science and technology
Neopentyl glycol 
Non Processor (DMA) Grant, part of the early computer bus Unibus
 Network participating group, a functional group of Link 16 participants

Other
Nevada Proving Grounds, a former name of the Nevada National Security Site

See also
PNG (disambiguation)